The 1981–82 Norwegian 1. Divisjon season was the 43rd season of ice hockey in Norway. Ten teams participated in the league, and Valerenga Ishockey won the championship.

Regular season

Playoffs

External links 
 Norwegian Ice Hockey Federation

Nor
GET-ligaen seasons
1981 in Norwegian sport
1982 in Norwegian sport